Angela López (born 2 December 1955) is a Puerto Rican former swimmer. She competed in four events at the 1976 Summer Olympics.

References

1955 births
Living people
Puerto Rican female swimmers
Olympic swimmers of Puerto Rico
Swimmers at the 1976 Summer Olympics
Swimmers at the 1971 Pan American Games
Pan American Games competitors for Puerto Rico
Place of birth missing (living people)
Central American and Caribbean Games silver medalists for Puerto Rico
Central American and Caribbean Games medalists in swimming
Competitors at the 1974 Central American and Caribbean Games
20th-century Puerto Rican women